Rear Admiral John Harvey Forbes Crombie CB DSO (16 February 1900 – 31 August 1972) was a Scottish Royal Navy officer who became Flag Officer, Scotland and Northern Ireland.

Naval career
Crombie joined the Royal Navy in 1913. He served in World War I in the battleship  and then in the destroyer . He also served in the Second World War as Commanding Officer of the minesweeper , as Senior Officer for Minesweepers in the White Sea and then as Director of Minesweeping at the Admiralty from 1943. After the War he became Commanding Officer of the aircraft carrier  before taking over command of the HMS Mercury the Royal Navy Signal School in 1948. He became Flag Officer, Scotland and Northern Ireland in 1951 and retired in 1953.

Family
He married Rosamund, daughter of Brigadier-General Rodney Style. Their daughter Julia Rosamond Crombie (b. August 1947) married, in 1974, John Algernon Henry Trotter of Mordington House, Berwickshire.

References

1900 births
1972 deaths
Royal Navy rear admirals
Companions of the Order of the Bath
Companions of the Distinguished Service Order
Military personnel from Edinburgh
Royal Navy personnel of World War II